Absolutely Freak Out (Zap Your Mind!!) is an album by the Acid Mothers Temple & The Melting Paraiso U.F.O., released in 2001. It is a double album, featuring four tracks on each disc.

The album was recorded at Acid Mothers Temple from May to July, 2000.

Track listing 
Disc One
 Star Child Vs Third Bad Stone  	3:49  	
 Supernatural Infinite Space / Waikiki Easy Meat 	19:09 	
 Grapefruit March / Virgin U.F.O. / Let's Have a Ball / Pagan Nova 	20:19 	
 Stone Stoner 	16:32

Disc Two
 The Incipient Light of the Echoes  	12:15  	
 Magic Aum Rock / Mercurical Megatronic Meninx 	7:39 	
 Children of the Drab / Surfin' Paris-Texas / Virgin U.F.O. Feed Back 	24:35 	
 The Kiss That Took a Trip / Magic Aum Rock Again / Love Is Overborne / Fly High 	19:25

References 

Acid Mothers Temple albums
2001 albums
Acid rock albums